Nicholas II Garai (c. 1367 – December 1433) was a powerful Hungarian baron who served as the Palatine of Hungary from 1402 until 1433 and the ban of Macsó, Usora, Só, Slavonia, Croatia and Dalmatia. He also ruled over the Braničevo, Syrmia, Bačka, Banat and Baranya regions through vassals. Together with his close ally Stibor of Stiboricz, he remained one of the richest and most powerful nobles in Hungary for over 30 years. Nicholas II Garai also served as de facto ruler of Hungary next to King Sigismund. In 1416 Sigismund extended their armorial bearings showing the Order of the Dragon and the Order of the Scarf. He presented the patent to his brother-in-law.

Nicholas II's first wife was Theodora of Serbia, daughter of Prince Lazar of Serbia. In 1405, he married Anna of Cilli, sister of King Sigismund's second wife, Barbara of Cilli, thereby becoming brother-in-law of the King and Queen of Hungary. His granddaughter Anna was engaged to King Matthias Corvinus.

Early life 

Nicholas was the son of Nicholas I Garai and his unnamed wife. His father established the prestige and the wealth of the Garai family during the reign of Louis I of Hungary. The year of Nicholas's birth is unknown, but he was born between the late 1350s and the middle of the 1360s. His father arranged Nicholas's engagement to Helen, a daughter of Lazar of Serbia.

Nicholas was present when his father died fighting against John Horváti and John of Palisna near their family seat, Gara (now Gorjani in Croatia), on 25 July 1386. Horváti and Palisna had risen up against Louis I's daughter and successor, Mary, in favor of Ladislaus of Naples. Nicholas became a staunch supporter of Mary's husband, Sigismund of Luxemburg, who was crowned King of Hungary on 31 March 1387.

Career

Ban of Macsó 

Sigismund made Nicholas ban (or governor) of Macsó (now Mačva in Serbia). The bans had traditionally also administered the nearby Bács, Baranya, Bodrog, Szerém and Valkó Counties. He and Stephen Losonci, Ban of Szörény, joined their forces and routed Horváti near Cserög (now Čerević in Serbia), thus restoring the king's authority in the region. In 1387, Nicholas was also made ispán (or head) of Verőce County. He persuaded his father-in-law, Lazar of Serbia, to swear fealty to Sigismund in 1389, according to a royal charter issued almost two decades later.

Situated near the southern frontiers, his estates were subjected to Ottoman raids, thus Nicholas wanted to seize new estates in the central territories of the Kingdom of Hungary. At his initiative, Sigismund seized Pápa and the fortress of Somló in Transdanubia from Nicholas Zámbó in exchange for royal estates in 1389. Nicholas soon persuaded the king to grant both domains to him and his brother, John, for their castle at Ivánkaszentgyörgy (Ivankovo, Croatia). Since Nicholas could not secure the defence of the southern frontier, the king dismissed him, appointing Losonci to administer Macsó in 1390. Before long, he regained the favor of the king who again made him ban of Macsó in 1393. Sigismund transferred Nicholas from Macsó to Croatia and Dalmatia in 1394. In May, a royal charter referred to him as the former ban of Macsó.

Ban of Croatia, Dalmatia and Slavonia 

Nicholas was first styled as the ban of Croatia and Dalmatia in a royal diploma issued in December. Historian Stanko Andrić proposes that the king promoted Nicholas to the new office most probably after the successful royal campaign against Bosnia in July. Before the end of the year, Nicholas routed Vuk Vukčić whom Ladislaus of Naples had appointed to represent him as his ban in the two realms. After his victory, the burghers of Split elected him the count of the town.

Nicholas left Croatia and Dalmatia to join the king's invasion of Wallachia in July 1395. He and Peter Perényi commanded the rearguard during the withdrawal of the royal troops from Wallachia. He spent several months in his estates before returning to Croatia. He and  John Szepesi, Bishop of Zagreb, jointly presided the sabor (or general assembly) in July 1396.

Nicholas accompanied Sigismund to a large-scale military campaign against the Ottoman Empire in 1396. The crusade ended with the Ottomans' great victory in the Battle of Nicopolis on 25 September, but Nicholas was one of the few who could flee from the battlefield. The king's defeat outraged Stephen II Lackfi, one of the noblemen whom Sigismund had appointed to rule the country during his absence. He and his nephew approached Ladislaus of Naples, who had not abdicated his claim to Hungary.

Nicholas came back from the crusade in the king's retinue. They landed at Split in Dalmatia on 21 December 1396. Before the end of the year, the burghers of Split elected Nicholas their count. The king and Nicholas put an end to the movements of the supporters of Ladislaus of Naples in the Dalmatian towns before hurrying to Križevci. The two Lackfis were summoned to the town where they were captured and murdered on 27 February 1397. Historian László Markó says, Nicholas and Hermann of Celje enticed them to come to Slavonia to facilitate their murder. Another historian, Elemér Mályusz, emphasizes that the exact circumstances of the purge are unknown, but he proposes that John Kanizsai, Archbishop of Esztergom, was most probably its initiator. After the "Bloody Sabor of Križevci" Sigismund made Nicholas Ban of Slavonia.

Sigismund granted Osor and Cres in Dalmatia to Nicholas and his brother in May. The two estates had been possessed by John Szerecsen and his sons, who failed to pay the taxes due to the bans. Sigismund held a Diet (or legislative assembly) at Temesvár (now Timișoara in Romania) to adopt measures to secure the defense of the southern frontier of the kingdom. At the Diet, the king granted "the banship of Dalmatia, Croatia and Slavonia together with its appurtenances and income" to Nicholas and John Garai till the end of their lives on 2 November.

Palatine 

Sigismund made him Palatine of Hungary in September 1402.

Family 

Nicholas's first wife, Helen (born as Theodora), was the daughter of Lazar of Serbia and his wife, Princess Milica Nemanjic, who was member of collateral branch of the Nemanjić dynasty. The year of their marriage is unknown, but it must have taken place before 1389, because in that year Nicholas was already Lazar's son-in-law. She gave birth to Nicholas's eldest son and namesake. Helen died before 1401, and Nicholas married Anne of Celje, daughter of count Hermann II of Celje. They had a daughter, Catherine, who married Henry VI, Count of Gorizia and gave birth to the last two sovereign counts of Gorizia, John II and Leonhard.

See also
House of Garai
Dorozsma

References

Sources

External links
Map: Lands ruled by Miklos Garai in 1400 AD

|-

|-

|-

|-

1367 births
1433 deaths
Palatines of Hungary
Hungarian nobility
Christians of the Battle of Nicopolis
Knights of the Dragon
Bans of Croatia
Bans of Macsó
Nicholas II
14th-century Hungarian people
15th-century Hungarian people